Alan Michael Jouban (born November 25, 1982) is an American retired professional mixed martial artist who competed in the Welterweight division. A professional competitor since 2010, Jouban has also formerly competed for the Ultimate Fighting Championship, Shark Fights, RFA and Tachi Palace Fights.

Background
Born and raised in Lafayette, Louisiana, Jouban competed in soccer from a young age through high school until tearing his ACL. He is of French and Syrian descent. Jouban attended and graduated from Ovey Comeaux High School and then went to University of Louisiana at Lafayette in his hometown for a couple of semesters, but left before finishing a degree.

Jouban later began training in Muay Thai in 2005 at the age of 23, and was undefeated as an amateur, which led him into a career in mixed martial arts.

Mixed martial arts career

Early career
Jouban had his first amateur fight on March 26, 2010, and won via TKO just 14 seconds into the first round. He had his first professional fight on February 8, 2011 vs. Kyle Griffin, winning via 15 second knockout in the first round.

Ultimate Fighting Championship
Jouban made his UFC debut on August 16, 2014 against Seth Baczynski at UFC Fight Night 47. Jouban won by knockout in the first round. The back and forth action earned both participants Fight of the Night honors.

Jouban next faced The Ultimate Fighter: Brazil 3 Middleweight winner Warlley Alves on November 8, 2014 at UFC Fight Night 56. Jouban lost the fight by a controversial unanimous decision.

Jouban faced Richard Walsh on February 28, 2015 at UFC 184. Jouban won the fight via knockout in the first round.

Jouban was expected to face Brian Ebersole on June 6, 2015 at UFC Fight Night 68. However, Jouban pulled out of the fight in late March citing injury and was replaced by Omari Akhmedov.

Jouban faced Matt Dwyer on July 15, 2015 at UFC Fight Night 71. Despite having a point taken away for an unintentional knee to his opponent's head, he won the back and forth fight by unanimous decision. Both participants were awarded Fight of the Night honors.

Jouban faced Albert Tumenov on October 3, 2015 at UFC 192. He lost the fight via TKO in the first round.

Jouban faced Brendan O'Reilly on March 20, 2016 at UFC Fight Night 85. Jouban won the fight via TKO in the first round.

Jouban was expected to face Nordine Taleb on July 7, 2016 at UFC Fight Night 90. However, Taleb pulled out of the bout in early June citing an injury and was replaced by promotional newcomer Belal Muhammad. He won the fight via unanimous decision. Both participants were awarded Fight of the Night honors for their performance.

Jouban faced Mike Perry on December 17, 2016 at UFC on Fox 22. He won the fight by unanimous decision.

Jouban faced Gunnar Nelson on March 18, 2017 at UFC Fight Night 107. After being rocked with a punch, Jouban lost the fight via a guillotine choke in the second round.

Jouban was briefly linked to a bout with Brian Camozzi on July 8, 2017 at UFC 213. However, Jouban pulled out of the fight on June 6 citing a foot injury.

Jouban faced Niko Price on August 5, 2017 at UFC Fight Night: Pettis vs. Moreno. He lost the fight via TKO.

Jouban faced Ben Saunders on February 24, 2018 at UFC on Fox 28. He won the back-and-forth fight via knockout in the second round. This win earned him the Fight of the Night bonus.

Jouban was expected to face Danny Roberts on July 22, 2018 at UFC Fight Night 134. However, on July 12, Jouban was pulled out from the fight, citing a neck injury.

Jouban faced Dwight Grant on April 13, 2019 at UFC 236. He lost the fight via split decision. Subsequently, Jouban signed a new, five-fight contract with the UFC.

After an 18 months hiatus, Jouban returned to faced Jared Gooden on November 21, 2020 at UFC 255. He won the fight via unanimous decision.

On May 10, 2021, Jouban announced his retirement from MMA to focus on broadcasting.

Personal life
Prior to signing with the UFC, Jouban was a professional model and also appeared in several television commercials. Jouban signed a deal with Versace in 2016. He appeared in a short film as the face of Versace's Dylan Blue fragrance advertisement along with Gigi Hadid.

Alan and his wife Nicole have a son, Cage (born 2012).

Championships and achievements

Mixed martial arts
Ultimate Fighting Championship
Fight of the Night (Four times)  vs. Seth Baczynski, Matt Dwyer, Belal Muhammad, and Ben Saunders
Fight Club OC
FCOC Welterweight Championship (One time)

Mixed martial arts record

|Win
|align=center|17–7
|Jared Gooden
|Decision (unanimous)
|UFC 255
|
|align=center|3
|align=center|5:00
|Las Vegas, Nevada, United States
|
|-
|Loss
|align=center|16–7
|Dwight Grant
|Decision (split)
|UFC 236 
|
|align=center|3
|align=center|5:00
|Atlanta, Georgia, United States
|
|-
|Win
|align=center|16–6
|Ben Saunders
||KO (punch)
|UFC on Fox: Emmett vs. Stephens 
|
|align=center|2
|align=center|2:38
|Orlando, Florida, United States
|
|-
|Loss
|align=center|15–6
|Niko Price
|TKO (punches)
|UFC Fight Night: Pettis vs. Moreno
|
|align=center|1
|align=center|1:44
|Mexico City, Mexico
|
|-
|Loss
|align=center|15–5
|Gunnar Nelson
|Submission (guillotine choke)
|UFC Fight Night: Manuwa vs. Anderson
|
|align=center|2
|align=center|0:46
|London, England
|
|-
|Win
|align=center|15–4
|Mike Perry
|Decision (unanimous)
|UFC on Fox: VanZant vs. Waterson
|
|align=center|3
|align=center|5:00
|Sacramento, California, United States
| 
|-
|Win
|align=center|14–4
|Belal Muhammad
|Decision (unanimous)
|UFC Fight Night: dos Anjos vs. Alvarez
|
|align=center|3
|align=center|5:00
|Las Vegas, Nevada, United States
|
|-
| Win
| align=center| 13–4
| Brendan O'Reilly
|TKO (elbows and punches)
| UFC Fight Night: Hunt vs. Mir
| 
| align=center|1
| align=center|2:15
| Brisbane, Australia
| 
|-
| Loss
| align=center| 12–4
| Albert Tumenov
| TKO (head kick and punches)
| UFC 192
| 
| align=center| 1
| align=center| 2:55
| Houston, Texas, United States
| 
|-
| Win
| align=center| 12–3
| Matt Dwyer
| Decision (unanimous)
| UFC Fight Night: Mir vs. Duffee
| 
| align=center| 3
| align=center| 5:00
| San Diego, California, United States
| 
|-
| Win
| align=center| 11–3
| Richard Walsh
| KO (elbow and punches)
| UFC 184
| 
| align=center| 1
| align=center| 2:19
| Los Angeles, California, United States
| 
|-
| Loss
| align=center| 10–3
| Warlley Alves
| Decision (unanimous)
| UFC Fight Night: Shogun vs. Saint Preux
| 
| align=center| 3
| align=center| 5:00
| Uberlândia, Brazil
| 
|-
| Win
| align=center| 10–2
| Seth Baczynski
| KO (punch)
| UFC Fight Night: Bader vs. St. Preux
| 
| align=center| 1
| align=center| 4:23
| Bangor, Maine, United States
| 
|-
| Win
| align=center| 9–2
| Ricky Legere Jr.
| Decision (split)
| RFA 15
| 
| align=center| 3
| align=center| 5:00
| Culver City, California, United States
| 
|-
| Win
| align=center| 8–2
| Armando Montoya Jr.
| KO (punch)
| RFA 14 
| 
| align=center| 2
| align=center| 3:33
| Cheyenne, Wyoming, United States
| 
|-
| Loss
| align=center| 7–2
| Mike Rhodes
| Decision (unanimous)
| RFA 10 
| 
| align=center| 5
| align=center| 5:00
| Des Moines, Iowa, United States
| 
|-
| Win
| align=center| 7–1
| Chris Spång
| TKO (punches)
| RFA 9
| 
| align=center| 3
| align=center| 1:23
| Los Angeles, California, United States
|
|-
| Win
| align=center| 6–1
| Rigo Oropeza
| TKO (punches)
| Fight Club OC: Rumble on the Range
| 
| align=center| 1
| align=center| 1:54
| Burbank, California, United States
| 
|-
| Win
| align=center| 5–1
| Cameron Mayer
| KO (punch)
| USA MMA: Stacked 2
| 
| align=center| 1
| align=center| 1:24
| Baton Rouge, Louisiana, United States
| 
|-
| Win
| align=center| 4–1
| Daniel McWilliams
| Submission (punches)
| National Fight Alliance: Valley Invasion 2
| 
| align=center| 1
| align=center| 0:46
| Los Angeles, California, United States
| 
|-
| Win
| align=center| 3–1
| D.J. Roberson
| Decision (unanimous)
| Shark Fights 20
| 
| align=center| 3
| align=center| 5:00
| Laughlin, Nevada, United States
| 
|-
| Win
| align=center| 2–1
| Andrew Goldthwaite
| KO (punches)
| Shark Fights 17: Horwich vs. Rosholt 2
| 
| align=center| 3
| align=center| 2:37
| Frisco, Texas, United States
| 
|-
| Loss
| align=center| 1–1
| Chidi Njokuani
| TKO (body kick)
| Tachi Palace Fights 9
| 
| align=center| 3
| align=center| 1:27
| Lemoore, California, United States
| 
|-
| Win
| align=center| 1–0
| Kyle Griffin
| KO (knee)
| Tachi Palace Fights 8
| 
| align=center| 1
| align=center| 0:15
| Lemoore, California, United States
| 
|}

Amateur fights

|-
|Win
|align=center|2–0
|Joden Seiders
|Submission (rear-naked choke)
|Tuff-N-Uff: Future Stars of MMA
|
|align=center|1
|align=center|1:06
|Las Vegas, Nevada, United States
|
|-
|Win
|align=center|1–0
|Dustin Chevalier
|TKO (punches)
|Tuff-N-Uff: Future Stars of MMA
|
|align=center|1
|align=center|0:14
|Las Vegas, Nevada, United States
|
|}

See also
 List of male mixed martial artists

References

External links

Official UFC Profile

1982 births
Living people
American male mixed martial artists
American people of French descent
American people of Syrian descent
Welterweight mixed martial artists
Mixed martial artists utilizing wrestling
Mixed martial artists utilizing Muay Thai
Mixed martial artists utilizing Brazilian jiu-jitsu
Mixed martial artists from Louisiana
Sportspeople from Lafayette, Louisiana
Ultimate Fighting Championship male fighters
American practitioners of Brazilian jiu-jitsu
American Muay Thai practitioners